Nasuhi al-Bukhari or Nasuh al-Boukhari (1881 – 1 July 1961) was a Syrian soldier and politician who briefly served as Prime Minister of Syria in 1939.

Career

Early career
Nasuhi al-Bukhari received his education at the Ottoman Military Academy in Istanbul. He served in the Ottoman Army until he was captured by the Allies during World War I. In 1916, after escaping his Siberian exile, he went back to Istanbul.

When the Ottoman Empire fell in 1918, Faisal I declared himself King of Syria. Under Faisal, Bukhari commanded the Aleppo garrison before being sent to Cairo in January 1920 as military attache to Egypt. In July 1920 French Mandate of Syria was declared, and the country was divided into several independent states. In September 1920, Haqqi al-Azm was appointed governor of the State of Damascus, and in December he appointed Bukhari as minister of military affairs in his administration, which served until 1922. After the suppression of the Great Syrian Revolt in 1926, Ahmad Nami was appointed by the new French Commissioner, Henri de Jouvenel, to head a provisional council of ministers in the State of Syria, which comprised the former states of Damascus and Aleppo. Bukhari served as minister of agriculture in Ahmad Nami's cabinet until its resignation in February 1928.

Premiership
On 5 April 1939, during a cabinet crisis between the ruling National Bloc and the opposition, nationalist leader Hashim al-Atassi called on Bukhari to form a non-party government. In addition to being premier, Bukhari held the portfolios of interior and defense, and appointed independent veteran politician, Khalid al-Azm, minister of economy. Bukhari had responsibility for talks to ratify the Franco–Syrian Treaty of Independence of 1936, but these broke down when the French retreated from the terms of the treaty, and demanded to keep several military bases in the country. He subsequently resigned on 8 July 1939.

Later life
Between August 1943 and November 1944 Bukhari was minister of education and acting minister of defence in Saadallah al-Jabiri's cabinet. However, his subsequent advocacy of a Syrian Army with military draft proved electorally unpopular in Damascus. After losing his parliamentary seat in the 1947 elections, he retired from political life.

References

Citations

Bibliography

External links
Nasuh al-Boukhari at syrianhistory.com

1881 births
1961 deaths
Prime Ministers of Syria
Syrian ministers of defense
Syrian ministers of interior
Agriculture ministers of Syria
Syrian ministers of education
People from Damascus
Turkish Military Academy alumni
Arabs from the Ottoman Empire
20th-century Syrian politicians